American Capitalist is the third studio album by American heavy metal band Five Finger Death Punch, released on October 11, 2011. It is the band's first album not to feature bassist Matt Snell, as he departed from the band in December 2010. The first single from the album entitled "Under and Over It", was released on July 27, 2011. The album debuted at number three on the Billboard 200 and sold more than 90,000 copies in the first week of release. In September 2012, the album was certified gold by the RIAA with sales of at least 500,000 copies. In 2012, the album won a RadioContraband Rock Radio Award for Album of the Year, and the single "Coming Down" won the award for Song of the Year. As of 2017, the album was certified platinum by the Recording Industry Association of America (RIAA) with sales of at least 1,000,000 copies.

Singles
Five singles have been released from the album, "Under and Over It", "Back for More", "Remember Everything", "Coming Down", and "The Pride".

Under and Over It

After its release as a single, "Under and Over It" enjoyed significant success. Its highest charted position on Billboards Hot Mainstream Rock Tracks chart was fifth; it reached 20th on the U.S. Rock Songs chart; and even appeared on the Billboard Hot 100. From July through November of 2011, the song was also the number one song on Sirius XM radio's Octane channel.

The Pride

"The Pride" is the third track on the album, and is often considered a list song. In an interview, guitarist Zoltan Bathory clarified the meaning of the song. "You can be a zebra or join the lion pride. You have to rebel against your circumstances, laziness and mediocrity—not the system."

The Tragic Truth
The song "The Tragic Truth" never made the standard edition of American Capitalist. According to an interview with Zoltan, "The Tragic Truth" was originally going to be on the album, but it wasn't mixed in time. "The Tragic Truth" then ended up on the iTunes edition of the album.

Critical reception

Terry Bezer of Rock Sound said that "American Capitalist announces them as the world champions at post-Black album piledriving riffs and soaring, US radio-friendly melodies. To knock it for being dumb would be to miss the point entirely." Amy Sciarretto from Loudwire commended the band for approaching the nu-metal formula with "solid songwriting and a genuine pissed off-ness" that has been masterly crafted throughout the album, revealing layers to the band that goes beyond "simplistic mook rock", concluding that "5FDP deliver mid-tempo, fiery, quality hard rock that should further increase their visibility." AllMusic editor Gregory Heaney praised the band's musicianship for replicating the "era of post-Pantera groove metal," highlighting the title track and "Menace" for encapsulating that sound but also gave credit to both "Coming Down" and "Remember Everything" for showcasing their ability to give ballads a more rougher edge, concluding that fans of Sevendust and Mudvayne will find interest in them through this record. PopMatters contributor Chris Colgan praised the overall consistency of the band's instrumentation and Ivan's "raw vocal prowess" being similar to their previous efforts but was critical of the lyrical content expounding messages of America and capitalism that goes against the band's penchant for "emotionally-charged lyrics about individualism, rage and darkness", concluding that "American Capitalist is just an unnecessary and irritating reminder that the American Dream is out of reach for most of us and will remain that way forever."

Track listing

Personnel

Five Finger Death Punch
Zoltan Bathory – rhythm guitar
Jason Hook – lead guitar, backing vocals
Ivan Moody – vocals
Jeremy Spencer – drums
Chris Kael – bass, backing vocals
Matt Snell - writing credit on "Remember Everything"

Additional personnel
Kevin Churko – production, engineering, mixing, mastering, bass
"Mr. Kane" Churko – engineering, remixing and co-wrote "Remember Everything"

Charts

Album

Singles

Certifications

References

2011 albums
Five Finger Death Punch albums
Albums produced by Kevin Churko